Several vessels have been named Rachel or Rachael:

  was launched at Whitby. She primarily traded with the Baltic, but made some voyages as a West Indiaman. A gale caused her crew to abandon her near Memel in October 1817.
 was launched at Bristol. She spent most of her career as a constant trader, sailing to and from Nevis. A French privateer captured her in 1803 but a Liverpool letter of marque quickly recaptured here. She was wrecked in July 1811.
 was launched in 1795 at Spain and may have been taken in prize. She entered British records in 1801. In 1803 she suffered a maritime mishap, and was captured by a French privateer, but recaptured by the British Royal Navy. She was lost at Fayal, Azores in 1810.
 was launched at Hilton (possibly South Hylton) or Sunderland, and apparently was initially registered and based at Greenock. In 1812 an American privateer captured her in a notable single-ship action, but the British Royal Navy recaptured her almost immediately. She then continued as a general trader and was last listed in 1833.
 was launched in Quebec. On 24 January 1813 she was sailing from Newfoundland to Barbados when she encountered a gale at  that dismasted her and reduced her to a complete wreck. She was condemned at Terceira Island. 

Ship names